Mullett was an American vessel taken in prize. She was condemned in 1814.

Mullett first appeared in the Register of Shipping (RS) in 1813 with T.Smith, master, Mullett, owner, and trade London-Suriname, changing to Plymouth–Suriname. She had undergone repairs for damages in 1813. On 24 April she put into Plymouth, as did , Annett master. Mullett was sailing from Plymouth to Suriname and London Packet was sailing from London to Havana when they ran foul of each other. 

On 10 August 1813 Mullett, Smith, master, arrived at Suriname after having gone ashore. 

On 19 February 1814 Mullett was at Berbice and unloading, being in a leaky state. She was condemned in March as being unseaworthy.

Notes

Citations

1813 ships
Age of Sail merchant ships of England
Maritime incidents in 1813